Ettrick, Roxburgh and Berwickshire is a constituency of the Scottish Parliament (Holyrood) covering part of the council area of Scottish Borders. It elects one Member of the Scottish Parliament (MSP) by the plurality (first past the post) method of election. It is also one of nine constituencies in the South Scotland electoral region, which elects seven additional members, in addition to the nine constituency MSPs, to produce a form of proportional representation for the region as a whole.

The constituency was established for the  2011 Scottish Parliament election, and covers parts of the former constituencies of Tweeddale, Ettrick and Lauderdale and Roxburgh and Berwickshire. The remaining parts of the Scottish Borders form part of the Midlothian South, Tweeddale and Lauderdale constituency.

Ettrick, Roxburgh and Berwickshire is currently held by the Conservatives. The current MSP is Rachael Hamilton, who won the seat at a 2017 by-election following the resignation of previous member John Lamont in order to contest the 2017 UK general election.

Electoral region 

The other eight constituencies of the South Scotland region are Ayr, Carrick, Cumnock and Doon Valley, Clydesdale, Dumfriesshire, East Lothian, Galloway and West Dumfries, Kilmarnock and Irvine Valley and Midlothian South, Tweeddale and Lauderdale.

The region covers the Dumfries and Galloway council area, part of the East Ayrshire council area, part of the East Lothian council area, part of the Midlothian council area, the Scottish Borders council area, the South Ayrshire council area and part of the South Lanarkshire council area.

Constituency boundaries and council areas 

The rest of the Scottish Borders is represented in the Scottish Parliament by the Midlothian South, Tweeddale and Lauderdale constituency.

The electoral wards in the Ettrick, Roxburgh and Berwickshire constituency are listed below. All of these wards are part of Scottish Borders.

Selkirkshire
Mid Berwickshire
East Berwickshire
Kelso and District
Jedburgh and District
Hawick and Denholm
Hawick and Hermitage

Members of the Scottish Parliament

Election results

2021 parliamentary election

2017 by-election

In April 2017, John Lamont announced his intention to resign his seat in the Scottish Parliament in order to contest the 2017 UK general election.

2016 parliamentary election

2011 parliamentary election

References

External links

Scottish Parliament constituencies and regions from 2011
Berwickshire
Politics of the Scottish Borders
Constituencies of the Scottish Parliament
Constituencies established in 2011
2011 establishments in Scotland
Eyemouth
Selkirk, Scottish Borders
Hawick
Jedburgh
Kelso, Scottish Borders
Coldstream
Duns, Scottish Borders